Draco sumatranus, the common gliding lizard, is a species of agamid lizard endemic to Southeast Asia. It has elongated ribs and skin flaps on the sides of its body.  When opened, these skin flaps allow it to glide between tree trunks.

Behavior
It is primarily a tree dweller, except that the females come down to the forest floor to lay eggs.

Description
The body is of a dark grey/brown colouration with stripes and patterns to help it camouflage against the tree trunks. The males have a yellow triangular flap of skin under the chin, the gular fold, which is used to communicate with other lizards, mostly for mating. Females have a much smaller and blue flap.

Diet
They feed on small insects. Usually ants and termites.

Habitat
They are relatively common in forests and in urban settings such as parks and gardens.

Geographic range
They are found in Southeast Asia: Indonesia, Malaysia, Singapore, and Palawan.

Taxonomy
It was formerly considered a sub-species of Draco volans.

References

External links
Photos and description
McGuire J, Heang KB. 2001. '"Phylogenetic systematics of Southeast Asian flying lizards (Iguania: Agamidae: Draco) as inferred from mitochondrial DNA sequence data". Biological Journal of the Linnean Society 72: 203–229.

Further reading
Baker, Nick; Lim, Kelvin. 2008. Wild Animals of Singapore: A Photographic Guide to Mammals, Reptiles, Amphibians and Freshwater Fishes. Honolulu: University of Hawaii Press. 180 pp. .
. 2006. A Photographic Guide to Snakes and Other Reptiles of Borneo. Sanibel Island, Florida: Ralph Curtis Publishing Inc. 144 pp. . (Draco sumatranus, p. 80).
Schlegel H. [1837 -] 1844. Abbildungen neuer oder unvollständing bekannter AMPHIBIEN, nach der Natur oder dem Leben entworfen, herausgegeben und mit einem erläuternden Texte begleitet. Düsseldorf: Arnz & Comp. xiv + 141 pp. (Draco viridis var. sumatrana, p. 91).

Draco (genus)
Reptiles described in 1844
Taxa named by Hermann Schlegel